A television director is in charge of the activities involved in making a television program or section of a program. They are generally responsible for decisions about the editorial content and creative style of a program, and ensuring the producer's vision is delivered. Their duties may include originating program ideas, finding contributors, writing scripts, planning 'shoots', ensuring safety, leading the crew on location, directing contributors and presenters, and working with an editor to assemble the final product. The work of a television director can vary widely depending on the nature of the program, the practices of the production company, whether the program content is factual or drama, and whether it is live or recorded.

Types of television director

Factual television director
Factual or documentary TV directors may take any number of roles in the television production process, or combine several roles in one.

Entertainment television director 
In a television show composed of individual episodes, the television director's role may differ from a film director's in that he or she will usually work only on some television episodes instead of being the auteur of the entire production.  In an episodic television production, the major creative control will likely reside with the television producer(s) of the show. However, the director has input, whether it be how, if and why something can or cannot be done.

Drama television director
In a dramatic arts production, the television director's role can be similar to a film director's, including giving cues to actors and directing the camera placement and movement.

Live television director 

Primarily, the live director is responsible for "calling" the broadcast, supervising the placement of professional video cameras (camera blocking), lighting equipment, microphones, props, graphics and the overall pacing and feel of the production.  Other than quickly calling out commands, the television director is also expected to maintain order among the staff in the control room, on the set, and elsewhere.

A news studio might have multiple cameras and few camera movements. In a sports broadcast, the director might have 20 or 30 cameras and must continuously tell each of the camera operators what to focus on.

While the director is responsible for specific shots and other production elements, the producer (typically seated behind the director in the second row of chairs in the control room) coordinates the "big picture", including commercial breaks and the running length of the show.

See also
Screenwriter
Showrunner
Television program creator
Television producer
Film director

 
Broadcasting occupations
Directors
Television terminology